Hugh Henry (born 12 February 1952) is a former Scottish Labour Party politician.  He was the Member of the Scottish Parliament (MSP) for Renfrewshire South, formerly Paisley South, from 1999 to 2016.

Background
Henry was born in Glasgow and raised in Erskine, Renfrewshire. He was educated at St Mirin's Academy in Paisley, the University of Glasgow and Jordanhill College of Education in Glasgow. Prior to working in politics, he worked as an accountant with IBM UK Ltd, as a teacher and as a welfare rights officer with Strathclyde Regional Council.  He was a local councillor from 1984 until 1999, including 4 years as leader of Renfrewshire Council. A former Marxist, he was once a supporter of the Militant tendency.

Member of the Scottish Parliament

Henry was appointed Deputy Minister for Health and Community Care in the Scottish Executive in 2001, and moved to become Deputy Minister for Social Justice in 2002. He was appointed Deputy Minister for Justice after the 2003 Scottish Parliament election, and became Minister for Education in 2006. He retained the education brief in opposition after the 2007 election. Henry was named Scottish Politician of the Year in 2010, for his performance as Convenor of the Public Affairs Committee. On 11 May 2011, Henry stood in the election for the 4th Presiding Officer of the Scottish Parliament, coming second to Tricia Marwick, a Scottish National Party MSP. He stood down from the Scottish Parliament on 23 March 2016.

Personal life 
Henry is married with two daughters and one son.

References

External links
 
Scottish Executive
Constituency website

1952 births
Living people
People from Renfrewshire
People educated at St Mirin's Academy
Scottish people of Irish descent
Politicians from Glasgow
Scottish accountants
Alumni of the University of Glasgow
Ministers of the Scottish Government
Labour MSPs
Members of the Scottish Parliament 1999–2003
Members of the Scottish Parliament 2003–2007
Members of the Scottish Parliament 2007–2011
Members of the Scottish Parliament 2011–2016
Scottish Labour councillors
Councillors in Renfrewshire
Militant tendency supporters